Yanacucho (Quechua yana black, k'uchu corner, "black corner") is a mountain in the Vilcanota mountain range in the Andes of Peru, about  high. It is situated in the Cusco Region, Canchis Province, Pitumarca District. Yanacucho lies southwest of the mountain named Comercocha and northwest of Cóndor Tuco.

References

Mountains of Peru
Mountains of Cusco Region